D31 is a state road in central Croatia connecting Velika Gorica and Glina to Croatian motorway network at the A11 motorway Velika Gorica - jug (south) interchange. The road also serves as a connection to the A3 motorway via D30 state road.
The road, as well as all other state roads in Croatia, is managed and maintained by Hrvatske ceste, state owned company.

Traffic volume 

Traffic is regularly counted and reported by Hrvatske ceste, operator of the road.

Road junctions and populated areas

Maps

Footnotes

Sources

D031
D031
D031